Richland Center is a city in Richland County, Wisconsin, United States that also serves as the county seat. The population was 5,114 at the 2020 census.

History
Richland Center was founded in 1851 by Ira Sherwin Hazeltine, a native of Andover, Vermont. Hazeltine was drawn to the site because of its abundant water power, fertile prairies, and its proximity to the geographical center of Richland County. Hazeltine offered to donate land to the county if Richland Center was voted the county seat. In 1852 the Wisconsin Legislature formally declared Richland Center as the seat of justice for Richland County. The present Richland County courthouse was built at Richland Center in 1889.

In 1876, a narrow gauge railroad branch connected Richland Center with the Chicago, Milwaukee & St. Paul Railroad at Lone Rock, Wisconsin, providing an outlet for the town's commerce. The line was originally constructed with maple rails, but it was rebuilt as a standard gauge iron railway in 1880. On October 8, 1882, the town's railway depot was destroyed when an early morning fire ignited two kegs of gunpowder stored inside, causing an explosion that tore the roof from the building and scorched several nearby rail cars. Another passenger depot, built in 1909, still stands today, serving as a visitor center for the community.

Richland Center became an important location for the women's suffrage movement in Wisconsin after Laura Briggs James, Julia Bowen, and other residents founded the Richland Center Woman's Club in early 1882. The club quickly became the largest suffrage group in the state and was influential in organizing the movement throughout Wisconsin. Susan B. Anthony visited Richland Center in 1886. Later, Laura James' daughter Ada James became influential in the movement, helping to found the Political Equality League in 1909 and advocating for women's rights, pacifism, birth control, and prohibition. Locally, the women's club was the driving force behind the construction of the Richland Center City Auditorium, which served as the city hall from 1913 to 1998. 

Frank Lloyd Wright was born in Richland Center in 1867. The A. D. German Warehouse, completed in 1921, is the only building designed by Wright in Richland Center and is an early representation of his Mayan Revival style.

The origin of GTE can be traced to the Richland Center Telephone Company.  In 1918, three Wisconsin public utility accountants (Sigurd L. Odegard, John A. Pratt, and John F. O'Connell) purchased the Richland Center Telephone Company for $33,500.  At that time, the modest company served only 1,466 telephones in southern Wisconsin. But in 1920, the three accountants formed the Commonwealth Telephone Company and engaged in an aggressive acquisition program, which dramatically expanded its services to more than 500,000 telephones in 25 states. Following bankruptcy during the Great Depression, the company reorganized into the General Telephone Corporation and continued to expand. After merging with Sylvania Electric Products in 1959, it once again changed its name, this time to General Telephone & Electronics Corporation (GT&E, later GTE). By 1969, GTE provided service to 10 million telephones across the nation, making it the largest independent telephone company in the United States.

Geography
Richland Center is located at  (43.337836, -90.384605).

The Pine River runs along the western edge of the town.

Demographics

2020 census
As of the census of 2020, the population was 5,114. The racial makeup of the city was 89.6% White, 1.3% Black or African American, 1.0% Asian, 0.3% Native American, 2.5% from other races, and 5.3% from two or more races. Ethnically, the population was 5.7% Hispanic or Latino of any race.

According  to the American Community Survey estimates for 2016-2020, the median income for a household in the city was $41,724, and the median income for a family was $57,813. Male full-time workers had a median income of $42,995 versus $35,221 for female workers. The per capita income for the city was $24,829. About 12.0% of families and 16.5% of the population were below the poverty line, including 20.2% of those under age 18 and 13.7% of those age 65 or over. Of the population age 25 and over, 90.2% were high school graduates or higher and 21.1% had a bachelor's degree or higher.

2010 census
As of the census of 2010, there were 5,184 people, 2,361 households, and 1,235 families residing in the city. The racial makeup of the city was 96.1% White, 0.7% African American, 0.2% Native American, 0.8% Asian, 1.2% from other races, and 0.9% from two or more races. Hispanic or Latino of any race were 3.3% of the population.

There were 2,361 households, of which 25.5% had children under the age of 18 living with them, 37.4% were married couples living together, 10.8% had a female householder with no husband present, 4.1% had a male householder with no wife present, and 47.7% were non-families. 40.9% of all households were made up of individuals, and 21.1% had someone living alone who was 65 years of age or older. The average household size was 2.12 and the average family size was 2.87.

The median age in the city was 40 years. 22.1% of residents were under the age of 18; 10.1% were between the ages of 18 and 24; 23.2% were from 25 to 44; 24.3% were from 45 to 64; and 20.4% were 65 years of age or older. The gender makeup of the city was 46.4% male and 53.6% female.

2000 census
As of the census of 2000, there were 5,114 people, 2,296 households, and 1,285 families residing in the city. The population density was 1,164.6 people per square mile (449.8/km2). There were 2,470 housing units at an average density of 562.5 per square mile (217.2/km2). The racial makeup of the city was 98.22% White, 0.16% African American, 0.25% Native American, 0.33% Asian, 0.35% from other races, and 0.68% from two or more races. Hispanic or Latino of any race were 0.92% of the population.

There were 2,296 households, out of which 25.6% had children under the age of 18 living with them, 41.6% were married couples living together, 11.3% had a female householder with no husband present, and 44.0% were non-families. 38.2% of all households were made up of individuals, and 21.1% had someone living alone who was 65 years of age or older. The average household size was 2.15 and the average family size was 2.83.

In the city, the population was spread out, with 21.6% under the age of 18, 10.9% from 18 to 24, 24.2% from 25 to 44, 20.3% from 45 to 64, and 23.0% who were 65 years of age or older. The median age was 40 years. For every 100 females, there were 84.4 males. For every 100 females age 18 and over, there were 78.8 males.

Transportation
Richland Airport (93C) serves the city and surrounding communities.

Education
The city is home to the University of Wisconsin–Platteville Richland campus, which is a freshman-sophomore campus in the University of Wisconsin System.

The city is served by the Richland School District.

Notable people

 Svetlana Alliluyeva, only daughter of Joseph Stalin
 James N. Azim, Jr., Wisconsin State Representative
 Levi H. Bancroft, Attorney General of Wisconsin, Speaker of the Wisconsin State Assembly
 Lynda Barry, cartoonist
 Ann Walsh Bradley, Wisconsin Supreme Court justice
 Raymond Leo Burke, Roman Catholic Archbishop and Cardinal
 J. E. Coffland, Wisconsin State Representative
 Frank J. Cosgrove, Wisconsin State Representative
 Robert H. DeLap, Wisconsin State Representative
 Bradie Ewing, NFL player
 William M. Fogo, Wisconsin State Representative
 Joe Garden, author, writer for "The Onion"
 Ada James, suffragette
 Birney Maries Jarvis, Wisconsin State Representative
 Clyde Jewett, Wisconsin State Representative
 Joshua L. Johns, U.S. Representative
 William H. Joslin, Wisconsin State Representative
 Jay G. Lamberson, Wisconsin State Representative
 Gilbert L. Laws, U.S. Representative
 Harley A. Martin, Wisconsin State Representative
 Jess Miller, Wisconsin State Senator 
 Oliver Munson, Wisconsin State Senator
 Deborah Polaski, international opera singer
 Daniel B. Priest, Wisconsin State Representative, lawyer
 Dale Schultz, Wisconsin State Senator
 Vernon Wallace Thomson, Governor of Wisconsin
 Frank Lloyd Wright, architect

Sister cities
Richland Center has two sister cities:
  Santa Teresa, Carazo Department, Nicaragua
  Yueqing, Zhejiang, China

References

External links

 City of Richland Center
 Richland Center Chamber of Commerce
 Sanborn fire insurance maps: 1885 1892 1899 1905 1912

Cities in Wisconsin
Cities in Richland County, Wisconsin
County seats in Wisconsin